The Lausiac History is a seminal work archiving the
Desert Fathers (early Christian monks who lived in the Egyptian
desert) written in 419-420 by Palladius of Galatia, at the request of Lausus, chamberlain at the court of the Byzantine Emperor Theodosius II.<ref
name=Introduction>Introduction, in public domain Section source.</ref>

Originally written in Greek, the Lausiac History was so popular it was soon translated into Arabic, Armenian, Coptic, Geʽez, Latin, Syriac and Sogdian.

History
The book was popular among monks all over the East, who appear to have added to it considerably in transcribing it. The first edition was a Latin version by Gentian Hervetus. A shorter Greek text was published by Johannes Meursius (Leyden, 1616), and a longer one by Fronton du Duc, and a still more complete one by J. Cotelerius. This longer version contains the text of Rufinus. Butler, Preuschen, and others think that the shorter text (of Meursius) is Palladius's authentic work, the longer version being interpolated. Amélineau holds that the longer text is all Palladius's work, and that the first thirty-seven chapters (about the monks of Lower Egypt) are mainly an account of what the author saw and heard, though even here he has also used documents. But he thinks the second part (about Upper Egypt) is merely a compilation from a Coptic or Greek document which Rufinus also used; so that Palladius's visit to Upper Egypt must be a literary fiction. But the shorter text itself exists in various forms. A Syrian monk, Anan-Isho, living in the sixth-seventh centuries in Mesopotamia, translated the Lausiac History into Syriac with further interpolations. At one time the Lausiac History was considered a compilation of imaginary legends. Roman Catholic scholars at the beginning of the twentieth century argued that it was also a serious source on Egyptian monasticism.

Liturgical usage
In the Eastern Orthodox Church (the Byzantine Rite) the Lausiac History is read at matins on the weekdays of Great Lent as two of the patristic readings, after the third kathisma and after the third ode of the canon.

An extract from the introduction
"In the fourth and fifth centuries of our era Egypt had come to be regarded with great reverence throughout Christendom as a Holy Land of piety.<ref
name=Introduction/>

"Pilgrims came from all parts to visit the saints who lived there, and several wrote descriptions of what they saw and heard, which are among the most interesting documents of the early Church. Palestine was so near that it was usually included in their tour; the glamour of its sacred sites, which remains with us still when that of Egypt has faded into oblivion, was already potent. But Palestine was clearly second to Egypt in the affections of the pilgrims. 

"[As] expressed by Chrysostom ... Egypt ... was destined to be more fervent than any other, to have its towns and even its deserts peopled by armies of saints living the life of angels, and to boast the greatest, after the apostles, of all saints, the famous Antony. 

"Palladius, ... made a pilgrimage to this holy land, like so many others, and stayed there many years. ... The character of the man stands out clearly in the History, He was sincere, simple-minded and not a little credulous. His deep religious fervour, of the ascetic type, needless to say, appears throughout the book."

People
The Lausiac History contains descriptions and narratives of various monks, abbots, and saints, including:

See also 
 Desert Mothers
 Sayings of the Desert Fathers

Bibliography 

Meyer, Robert T. Palladius: The Lausiac History. ACW 34. New York: Newman Press, 1965; reprint: Paulist Press.
Vivian, Tim. "Coptic Palladiana I: The Life of Pambo." Coptic Church Review 20, no. 3 (1999): 66–95.
Vivian, Tim. "Coptic Palladiana II: The Life of Evagrius." Coptic Church Review 21, no. 1 (2000): 8–23.
Vivian, Tim. "Coptic Palladiana III: The Life of Macarius of Egypt." Coptic Church Review 21, no. 3 (2000): 82–109.
Vivian, Tim. "Coptic Palladiana [IV]: St. Macarius of Alexandria." Coptic Church Review 22, no. 1 (2001): 2–22.

References

External links
 html
 The Paradise Of the Holy Fathers: Volumes 1 & 2
 
 3 Palladius: historia lausiaca, etc. at OPenn

Byzantine Rite
Christian hagiography
5th-century Christian texts
Works by the Church Fathers
Byzantine literature